Charles N. Keenja (24 December 1940 - 05 August 2021) was a Tanzanian CCM politician and a cabinet Minister. 

He was a Member of Parliament in the National Assembly of Tanzania served Ubungo  constituency and succeeded by John Mnyika in 2005. He was cabinet Minister of Agriculture and Food Security.

From 1996 to 2000 he was the chairman of Dar es Salaam for which work he received the UN-Habitat Scroll of Honour Award.

References

Living people
Members of the National Assembly (Tanzania)
Chama Cha Mapinduzi MPs
1940 births
Place of birth missing (living people)